Jaroslav Hílek (born 6 June 1978) is a Slovak football player who currently plays for ŠK SFM Senec, on loan from FK Viktoria Žižkov .

External links
  Profile at fcdac1904.com
  Profile at iDNES.cz

1978 births
Living people
Slovak footballers
FK Senica players
FC Spartak Trnava players
SK Dynamo České Budějovice players
FK Viktoria Žižkov players
Expatriate footballers in the Czech Republic
Czech First League players
FC DAC 1904 Dunajská Streda players
ŠK Senec players
Slovak Super Liga players

Association football midfielders